Storer is a surname. Notable people with the surname include:

Arthur Storer, a 17th-century American astronomer
Bellamy Storer:
Bellamy Storer (1796–1875), U.S. Representative from Ohio, served in the 24th Congress
Bellamy Storer (1847–1922), his son, U.S. Representative from Ohio, served in the 52nd and 53rd Congresses
Bill Storer, an English cricketer
Clement Storer, a United States Senator from New Hampshire
David Storer, English cricket player
David Humphreys Storer (1804-1891), American physician and zoologist from New England
Francis Humphreys Storer (1832-1914), American chemist, son of D. H. Storer
Horatio Storer (1830–1922), American physician and anti-abortion activist, son of D. H. Storer
James Sargant Storer (1771–1853), English draughtsman and engraver
Richard Storer (born 1948), English cricketer
Robert Storer:
Robert Treat Paine Storer (1893-1963), Harvard football captain
Robert Vivian Storer, (1900-1958) Australian venereologist, sex educator, and writer
Robert W. Storer (1914–2008), American ornithologist
Sara Storer, an Australian country music singer
Thomas Storer, an English writer
Tim Storer, an Australian politician and businessman
Tracy Irwin Storer (1889-1973), an American zoologist from California
Gilby Storer (2008-)  an English politician, Songwriter and owns law firm

See also
Storer Broadcasting, an early 20th-century United States broadcasting company
Storer College, a historically black college in West Virginia
Storer's Regiment of Militia, an American Revolutionary War military unit
Storer v. Brown, a United States Supreme Court case